The Dinopercidae, known commonly as the cavebasses, are a family of marine ray-finned fish from the perciform superfamily Percoidea. They are native to the western Indian and the Atlantic coasts of Africa.

Genera
There are two genera within the family:

 Centrarchops Fowler, 1923
 Dinoperca Boulenger, 1895

See also
List of fish families

References

Further reading
Heemstra, P. C. and T. Hecht. Dinopercidae, a New Family for the Percoid Marine Fish Genera Dinoperca Boulenger and Centrarchops Fowler (Pisces: Perciformes). Ichthyological Bulletin of the J. L. B. Smith Institute of Ichthyology, J.L.B. Smith Institute of Ichthyology, Rhodes University, Grahamstown, South Africa. 1986.